Samuel Barber (September 17, 1919 – April 18, 1999) was an American baseball pitcher in the Negro leagues.

A native of Birmingham, Alabama, Barber played with the Birmingham Black Barons in 1940, and served in the US Army during World War II. He died in Birmingham in 1999 at age 79.

References

External links
 and Seamheads 

Birmingham Black Barons players
1919 births
1999 deaths
Baseball players from Birmingham, Alabama
Baseball pitchers
African Americans in World War II
United States Army personnel of World War II
African-American United States Army personnel